Walckenaeria columbia is a species of dwarf spider in the family Linyphiidae. It is found in the United States and Canada.

References

Linyphiidae
Articles created by Qbugbot
Spiders described in 1983